Deloo, or Ntrubo, is a Gur language of Ghana and Togo.

References

Languages of Ghana
Languages of Togo
Gurunsi languages